The Diocese of Masuria is one of the six dioceses constituting the Evangelical Church of the Augsburg Confession in Poland. The diocesan headquarters are located in Olsztyn.

Location 
The Diocese of Masuria is located in northeastern Poland. Its territory extends in the north to the border with Kaliningrad and in the east to the border with Belarus. It includes Warmia-Masuria and Podlaskie.

List of Bishops of Masuria 
Edmund Fiszke : 1946~1958
Alfred Jagucki : 1959~1963
Vacant (1963~1966)
Paweł Kubiczek : 1966~1991
Rudolf Bażanowski : 1992~2018
Paweł Hause : 2018~

External links 
Official Homepage of The Diocese of Masuria (pol.)

Evangelical Church of the Augsburg Confession in Poland
Lutheran dioceses in Poland